Lieutenant-Colonel George Hele Treby (c.1727 – 12 May 1763) was a British soldier and politician from Devonshire.

Origins
He was the younger son of the politician George II Treby (c.1684–10 Mar 1741), of Plympton House, Plympton St Maurice, Devon, MP for the family's Rotten Borough of Plympton Erle, and was the younger brother of George III Treby (c.1726-1761), MP for Plympton Erle.

Career
He was commissioned into the British Army and was promoted to captain and later Lieutenant-Colonel in the 1st Foot Guards in 1758.

Treby entered the House of Commons for Plympton Erle at a by-election in 1761 to replace his elder brother, George III Treby. However, he died in 1763. He was replaced at the following by-election by his brother-in-law, Paul Henry Ourry (1719-1783), who also inherited the Treby family's residence, Plympton House.

References

1720s births
1763 deaths
British MPs 1761–1768
Grenadier Guards officers
Members of the Parliament of Great Britain for Plympton Erle